Ethmia lybiella is a moth in the family Depressariidae. It was described by Ragonot in 1892. It is found in Algeria, Tunisia, Libya and Palestine.

References

Moths described in 1892
lybiella